Édouard Caron was a politician in the Quebec, Canada, who served as Member of the Legislative Assembly.

Early life

He was born on April 22, 1830 in Louiseville, Mauricie.

City Politics

He served as Mayor of Louiseville (then known as Rivière-du-Loup) in 1874.

Provincial Politics

Caron, ran as a Conservative candidate in the district of Maskinongé in 1867, but was defeated.

He won a seat to the Legislative Assembly of Quebec in 1878 in the same district and was re-elected in 1881 and 1886.

His last re-election though was declared void in 1887.  A by-election was called to settle the matter in 1888, which Caron lost against candidate Joseph-Hormisdas Legris of Honoré Mercier's Parti National.

Death

He died on February 25, 1900.

Footnotes

External links 
 Biography at the Dictionary of Canadian Biography Online

Edouard Caron
1830 births
1900 deaths
Mayors of places in Quebec
Conservative Party of Quebec MNAs